Silvia La Fratta (born 5 November 1967) is a former professional tennis player from Italy.

Biography
La Fratta, who was right-handed, had a best singles ranking of 114 and was a quarterfinalist at the 1988 Belgian Open.

In doubles, she was ranked as high as 127, with one WTA Tour final appearance at the 1988 Swedish Open, where she and Linda Ferrando were beaten by Sandra Cecchini and Mercedes Paz.

Her most notable achievement on tour was reaching the round of 16 as a qualifier at the 1989 French Open. She had wins over Gigi Fernández, Elna Reinach and Andrea Vieira, before being eliminated by top seed Steffi Graf. This was her maiden Grand Slam main-draw appearance. She played in only two more Grand Slam events, the French Open and Wimbledon in 1990.

WTA career finals

Doubles: 1 (runner-up)

ITF finals

Singles: 3 (3 titles)

Doubles: 1 (1 title)

References

External links
 
 

1967 births
Living people
Italian female tennis players
20th-century Italian women